= List of supermarket chains in Mongolia =

This is a list of supermarket chains in Mongolia.

== Supermarkets ==
Name	First store opened in	Number of stores	Owner
MINII	1992	70	Minii Delguur LLC
Nomin	1994	54	Nomintav LLC
KHANBURGEDEI	1991	8 (Premium Supermarkets)	TTEM LLC
Emart	2016	5	Sky Hypermarket llc
Orgil Supermarket	1995	15 (Including Cash & Carry)	Circle Co., LTD
Max Foods	1996	10	Max Group
ZAZA Supermarket	2015	2	ZAZA Mart LLC
Good Price Market	2012	5 (Premium Supermarkets)	Ulemj Grocers LLC
